The 1991 Women's Field Hockey Olympic Qualifier was held in Auckland, New Zealand with twelve teams took part in the competition.

Final standings
The teams qualified to the 1992 Summer Olympics in bold

References

1991
1991 in women's field hockey
field hockey
1991 Women's Field Hockey Olympic Qualifier
Qualification
Field hockey
Sport in Auckland